Miguel Antonio de Ustáriz, (died on the Atlantic Ocean in 1792) was governor of Puerto Rico from 1789 to 1792.

Governors of Puerto Rico

1792 deaths
Year of birth unknown